Kaniv Raion was a raion (district) of Cherkasy Oblast, central Ukraine. Its administrative centre was located at the town of Kaniv which was incorporated separately as a city of oblast significance and did not belong to the raion. The raion was abolished on 18 July 2020 as part of the administrative reform of Ukraine, which reduced the number of raions of Cherkasy Oblast to four. The area of Kaniv Raion was merged into Cherkasy Raion. The last estimate of the raion population was 

At the time of disestablishment, the raion consisted of three hromadas:
 Bobrytsia rural hromada with the administration in the selo of Bobrytsia;
 Lipliave rural hromada with the administration in the selo of Lipliave;
 Stepantsi rural hromada with the administration in the selo of Stepantsi.

References

Former raions of Cherkasy Oblast
1923 establishments in Ukraine
Ukrainian raions abolished during the 2020 administrative reform